Parasynthemis is a genus of dragonflies in the family Synthemistidae,
There is only one species of this genus which is endemic to south-eastern Australia.

Species
The genus Parasynthemis includes one species:
 Parasynthemis regina  - Royal tigertail

See also
 List of Odonata species of Australia

References

Synthemistidae
Anisoptera genera
Monotypic Odonata genera
Odonata of Australia
Endemic fauna of Australia
Taxa named by Frank Louis Carle
Insects described in 1995